North Central High School is a public high school in Pioneer, Ohio.  It is the only high school in the North Central Local Schools district.  Their nickname is the Eagles.  They are members of the Buckeye Border Conference.

Ohio High School Athletic Association State Championships

References

External links
 District Website

High schools in Williams County, Ohio
Public high schools in Ohio